Peter Larsson (born November 10, 1978 in Luleå, Norrbotten) is a Swedish cross-country skier who has competed since 2000. He has six World Cup victories from 2002 to 2007, all in sprint events.

At the 2006 Winter Olympics in Turin, Larsson finished 13th in the sprint event. He finished 17th in the sprint event at the FIS Nordic World Ski Championships 2003 in Val di Fiemme.

Cross-country skiing results
All results are sourced from the International Ski Federation (FIS).

Olympic Games

World Championships

World Cup

Season standings

Individual podiums
 4 victories – (4 ) 
 9 podiums – (9 )

Team podiums
 3 victories – (3 )
 4 podiums – (4 )

References

External links

1978 births
Living people
People from Luleå
Cross-country skiers from Norrbotten County
Cross-country skiers at the 2002 Winter Olympics
Cross-country skiers at the 2006 Winter Olympics
Olympic cross-country skiers of Sweden
Swedish male cross-country skiers